The Malacky District is a district in
the Bratislava Region of western Slovakia. It lies north from Bratislava on Záhorská nížina lowland. Its current borders have been established in 1996. The administrative seat is its largest town, Malacky.

Municipalities

References

External links
 

Districts of Slovakia
Geography of Bratislava Region